"Wish I Didn't Miss You" is a song by American recording artist Angie Stone. It was written by Ivan Matias and Andrea Martin for Stone's second studio album, Mahogany Soul (2001), while production was helmed by Matias, Martin and Swizz Beatz. The song features a sampled composition of the O'Jays's 1972 record "Back Stabbers" as written by Leon Huff, Gene McFadden, and John Whitehead. It was the last song ever played at Space nightclub in Ibiza on October 3, 2016. It was played by Carl Cox.

Critical reception
Jose F. Promis from AllMusic wrote that Mahogany Souls "true gem is the smoldering, gorgeous, aching 'Wish I Didn't Miss You,' which pulls forward with an unstoppable beat and features a stellar, yearning performance from Miss Stone." Similarly, Barry Walters from Rolling Stone declared it the album's "knockout track". Spin magazine ranked the song among the 20 best singles of 2002 and wrote: "If Angie were skinny, Whitney would be unnecessary and Mary J. would be worried. Sad but true".

Chart performance
Remixed by Hex Hector and Mac Quayle, "Wish I Didn't Miss You" became a successful club hit and gay anthem.

Track listings

US 12-inch single
A1. "Wish I Didn't Miss You" (long version) – 4:31
B1. "Wish I Didn't Miss You" (instrumental) – 4:35
B2. "Wish I Didn't Miss You" (a cappella) – 4:30

US 12-inch single (The Remixes)
A1. "Wish I Didn't Miss You" (Hex Hector / Mac Quayle club mix) – 9:54
A2. "Wish I Didn't Miss You" (Hex Hector / Mac Quayle Vibe mix) – 7:55
B1. "Wish I Didn't Miss You" (Pound Boys Stoneface Bootleg mix) – 7:51
B2. "Brotha" (Spen & Karizma club mix) – 7:40

UK CD single
 "Wish I Didn't Miss You" (album version) – 4:33
 "Wish I Didn't Miss You" (Hex Hector / Mac Quayle Mixshow) – 5:43
 "Gotta Get to Know You Better" – 5:00
 "Wish I Didn't Miss You" (video) – 4:05

UK 12-inch single
A1. "Wish I Didn't Miss You" (album version) – 4:33
A2. "Wish I Didn't Miss You" (Hex Hector / Mac Quayle Mixshow) – 5:43
B1. "Wish I Didn't Miss You" (Pound Boys Stoneface Bootleg mix) – 7:51

European CD single
 "Wish I Didn't Miss You" (album version) – 4:33
 "Gotta Get to Know You Better" – 5:00

European maxi-CD single
 "Wish I Didn't Miss You" (album version) – 4:33
 "Wish I Didn't Miss You" (radio vibe mix) – 3:30
 "Wish I Didn't Miss You" (Pound Boys Stoneface Bootleg mix) – 7:51
 "Gotta Get to Know You Better" – 5:00

Australian CD single
 "Wish I Didn't Miss You" (Hot mix radio) – 4:19
 "Wish I Didn't Miss You" (Hex Hector / Mac Quayle club mix) – 9:54
 "Wish I Didn't Miss You" (Hex Hector / Mac Quayle vibe mix) – 7:55
 "Wish I Didn't Miss You" (Pound Boys Stoneface Bootleg mix) – 7:51
 "Brotha" (Spen & Karizma club mix) – 7:40

Charts

Weekly charts

Year-end charts

Certifications

Release history

References

External links
 

2000s ballads
2002 singles
2002 songs
Angie Stone songs
Contemporary R&B ballads
J Records singles
Songs written by Andrea Martin (musician)
Songs written by Gene McFadden
Songs written by Ivan Matias
Songs written by John Whitehead (singer)
Songs written by Leon Huff
Torch songs